Infectious pancreatic necrosis birnavirus Vp4 peptidase (infectious pancreatic necrosis virus protease, IPNV Vp4 protease, IPNV Vp4 peptidase, NS protease, NS-associated protease, Vp4 protease) is an enzyme. This enzyme catalyses the following chemical reaction

 Cleaves the (Ser/Thr)-Xaa-Ala-(Ser/Ala)-Gly motif in the polyprotein NH2-pVP2-VP4-VP3-COOH of infectious pancreatic necrosis virus at the pVP2-VP4 and VP4-VP3 junctions

Infectious pancreatic necrosis virus is a birnavirus that causes an acute, contagious disease in young salmonid fish.

References

External links 
 

EC 3.4.21